The Roman Catholic Diocese of Menorca is a diocese located in the island of Menorca in the Ecclesiastical province of Valencia in Spain.

History
It was established as the Diocese of Menorca in the 5th century.

Leadership

Antonio Vila Campos (18 Dec 1797 – 20 Dec 1802) 
Pedro Antonio Juano (20 Dec 1802 – 4 Jan 1814) 
Santiago Creus Martí (11 Jul 1815 – 29 May 1820) 
Antonio Ceruelo Sanz (30 May 1824 – 15 Jan 1831) 
Juan Antonio Díez Merino, O.P. (26 Mar 1831 – 16 Apr 1844) 
Tomás Roda Rodríguez (27 Sep 1852 – 20 Dec 1857) 
Mateo Jaume Garau (21 Dec 1857 – 17 Sep 1875) 
Manuel Mercader y Arroyo (17 Sep 1875 – 21 Feb 1890) 
Juan Comes y Vidal (26 Jun 1890 – 25 Jun 1896) 
Salvador Castellote y Pinazo (25 Jun 1896 – 26 Dec 1901) 
Juan Torres Ribas (9 Jun 1902 – 20 Jan 1939) 
Bartolomé Pascual Marroig (4 Mar 1939 – 18 Mar 1967) 
Miguel Moncadas Noguera (11 Dec 1968 – 1 Apr 1977) 
Antonio Deig Clotet (20 Sep 1977 – 7 Mar 1990) 
Francesc-Xavier Ciuraneta Aymí (12 Jun 1991 – 29 Oct 1999) 
Juan Piris Frígola (1 Mar 2001 – 16 Jul 2008) 
Salvador Giménez Valls (21 May 2009 – 28 Jul 2015)
Francisco Conesa Ferrer (27 Oct 2016 – 3 Jan 2022)
Gerardo Villalonga Hellín (14 Feb 2023 – present)

See also
Roman Catholicism in Spain

External links
 GCatholic.org
 Catholic Hierarchy
 Diocese website

Roman Catholic dioceses in Spain
Dioceses established in the 5th century